Adventures of a Private Eye is a 1977 British sex comedy film directed by Stanley Long and starring Christopher Neil, Suzy Kendall, Harry H. Corbett and Liz Fraser. It followed the 1976 film Adventures of a Taxi Driver and was followed the next year by Adventures of a Plumber's Mate.

Cast
 Christopher Neil as Bob West
 Suzy Kendall as Laura Sutton
 Harry H. Corbett as Sydney
 Diana Dors as Mrs. Horne
 Liz Fraser as Violet
 Adrienne Posta as Lisa Moroni
 Jon Pertwee as Judd Blake
 Irene Handl as Miss Friggin
 Anna Quayle as Medea
 Ian Lavender as Derek
 Willie Rushton as Wilfred
 Fred Emney as Sir Basil
 Julian Orchard as Police Cyclist
 Robin Stewart as Scott
 Veronica Doran as Maud
 Angela Scoular as Jane Hogg
 Jonathan Adams as Inspector Hogg
 Richard Caldicot as Craddock
 Hilary Pritchard as Sally
 Nicholas Young as Legs Luigi
 Linda Regan as Clarissa
 Leon Greene as Rosco
 Shaw Taylor as himself

Production
It was one of a series of sex comedies featuring Diana Dors.

References

Keeping the British End Up: Four Decades of Saucy Cinema by Simon Sheridan (Titan Books) (4th edition), 2011

External links 
 

1977 films
1970s sex comedy films
British sex comedy films
1977 comedy films
1970s English-language films
Films directed by Stanley Long
1970s British films